The Cruel Birth of Bangladesh: Memoirs of an American Diplomat, is American Diplomat Archer Blood's account of the emergence of Bangladesh, published by University Press Limited in 2002. After the State Department declassified the documents, telegrams and other messages relating to this period, Blood wrote 24 chapters describing the events of 1971 as he and the staff of the United States Mission in Dhaka witnessed.

The Cruel Birth of Bangladesh is part of the road to Bangladesh series, where accounts of the emergence of Bangladesh are published.

The book received University Press Limited's "Outstanding Impact Award" at the UPL Excellence Awards 2018.

References 

History books about Bangladesh
2002 non-fiction books
21st-century history books
Bangladesh Liberation War books
Genocide studies